John Sylvester White Jr. (October 31, 1919 – September 11, 1988) was an American actor. Best known as Mr. Michael Woodman in Welcome Back, Kotter (1975-1979).

Early life
John Sylvester White was born in Philadelphia, Pennsylvania  but grew up in the new town of Colmar Manor, Maryland, a bedroom community suburb of northeast Washington, D.C., where his father, an attorney also of the same name, was elected the first mayor of the community in July 1927.

Acting career
Before becoming known in the 1970s as the assistant principal (and later head principal) Mr. Woodman on the sitcom Welcome Back, Kotter, White had been best known for his starring role as Keith Barron, the first husband of Mary Stuart's character Joanne Gardner on the television soap opera Search for Tomorrow from 1951 to 1952. Starting in 1970, he had guest appearances on various television shows, including Kojak and Baretta, and TV movies such as The Marcus-Nelson Murders,<ref name="Obit">"John Sylvester White, TV actor, 68, dies here", The Honolulu Advertiser (September 13, 1988), p. D-2.</ref>  before landing a recurring role on the Kotter show. In 1983, he appeared as Mr. Vogelman, the proprietor of the Raytown Travel Agency in the episode titled "Mama Gets a Job" (Season 1 - Episode 7) on Mama's Family.

White married Joan Stanton, known as Joan Alexander in the 1940s when she was the voice of Lois Lane on the radio version of "The Adventures of Superman''", in 1944. They later divorced. White moved to Hawaii in the early 1980s.

Death
He died on September 11, 1988, from pancreatic cancer in Waikiki, Hawaii, at the age of 68.

Filmography

References

External links

 John S. White, Actor's Father, First Mayor of Town of Colmar Manor, Maryland, 1927

1919 births
1988 deaths
American male television actors
American male soap opera actors
Male actors from Maryland
Male actors from Philadelphia
People from Prince George's County, Maryland
Deaths from pancreatic cancer
Deaths from cancer in Hawaii
20th-century American male actors